The Army Training Centre Pirbright is an initial training establishment of the British Army, at Pirbright Camp.

Scope
The ATC, along with the Army Training Regiment Winchester and the Army Training Regiment Grantham, provides Phase 1 military training for all recruits over the age of 18, who are joining the Army Air Corps, the Royal Regiment of Artillery, Royal Corps of Signals, the Royal Logistic Corps, the Adjutant General's Corps, the Royal Army Medical Corps, the Royal Engineers, the Royal Armoured Corps, the Royal Corps of Army Music and the Intelligence Corps.

Organisation 
The centre is organized into three regiments as follows;

Centre Headquarters
Headquarters Regiment
1st Army Training Regiment (Pirbright)
Jackson Company, Adjutant General's Corps
59 (Asten) Battery, Royal Artillery
Chavasee Company, Royal Army Medical Corps
2nd Army Training Regiment (Pirbright)
1 (Fowler) Signal Squadron, Royal Corps of Signals (part of wider 11th (RSS) Signal Regiment)
Caen Squadron, Royal Armoured Corps (administered by the RAC training regiment)
D Company (training Army Reservists)
28 Squadron, Royal Engineers
108 (Princess Royal's) Squadron, Royal Logistic Corps

In media 
Pirbright was the filming location for British Army Girls, a three-part television documentary first shown on Channel 4 in April 2016.

References

External links 
 ATC Pirbright at army.mod.uk

Barracks in England
Borough of Guildford
Education in Surrey
Organisations based in Surrey
Training establishments of the British Army
1875 establishments in England